Robert J. Kupec (born November 27, 1968) is a Minnesota politician and member of the Minnesota Senate. A member of the Democratic-Farmer-Labor Party (DFL), he represents Senate District 4, which includes most of  Clay and Becker counties. Prior to seeking elected office, he was for a decade the chief meteorologist at KVRR and previously at WDAY-TV.

Early life, education, and career 
Kupec was born in eastern Connecticut. Both of his parents were active union organizers. He attended college at the State University of New York-Albany, studying Atmospheric Science, and earned a degree in 1992. He moved to Moorhead, Minnesota in 2000, and began work as a meteorologist, first for WDAY-TV and then served as chief meteorologist for KVRR.

Political career 
Prior to moving to Minnesota, Kupec ran as a Green party candidate for the Albany County Legislature in 1999.

In 2022, incumbent DFL state senator Kent Eken decided not to seek reelection. Kupec ran, and was unopposed in the DFL primary. He defeated Moorhead City Councilman and Republican Dan Bohmer in the general election, winning 52.5% of the vote compared to Bohmer's 46.8%.

Kupec serves on the following committees:

 Vice Chair: Agriculture, Broadband, and Rural Development
 Health and Human Services
 Higher Education
 Labor

Personal life 
He is married to Deb White, a Moorhead City Councilwoman. They have one son, Quinn.

References

Democratic Party Minnesota state senators
American meteorologists